An Indian passport is a passport issued by the Government of India to citizens of the Republic of India for travelling abroad. It enables the bearer to travel internationally and serves as proof of Indian citizenship as per the Passports Act (1967).

Passport Offices in India are known as Passport Seva Kendras (PSK's). As of April 2022, The Ministry of External Affairs operates 88 PSKs in major cities and these PSK's are administrated by 37 Regional Passport Offices. The ministry has also setup 11 mini passport offices known as Passport Seva Laghu Kendras.

Passport Seva Kendras (PSK)

Passport Seva Laghu Kendras (PSLK)

Source:
Passport Seva, Ministry of External Affairs, Government of India
City Codes of Passport Offices
Post Office Passport Seva Kendra Locator

References

Lists of government agencies in India
Ministry of External Affairs (India)
India government-related lists
India